The Rampur Greyhound is a breed of sighthound native to the Rampur region of Northern India, which lies between Delhi and Bareilly. It is believed the Rampur Greyhound descends from early Afghan Hounds, with their present-day appearance due to extensive crosses to the Greyhound in the 19th century to improve the breed's speed. The Rampur Greyhound is a shorthaired, powerfully built sighthound that resembles the Sloughi in appearance. It is rarely seen outside of its native land where it is retained as a coursing dog and is rarely kept as a companion.

See also
 Dogs portal
 List of dog breeds
 List of dog breeds from India

References

External links

The Kennel Club of India

Sighthounds
Rampur, Uttar Pradesh
Dog breeds originating in India